The Danube Strategy of the European Union aimed at closer cooperation between the states along the Danube. The focus is on the areas of infrastructure, environmental protection, wealth creation and good governance.

History of the Danube Strategy 
The original initiative for a Danube strategy came from the European Commission. At a conference in Brussels in October 2008, to which the state of Baden-Württemberg and Prime Minister Günther Oettinger had invited, the then Commissioner for Regional Policy Danuta Hübner called for "a specific strategy comparable to the one we are developing for the Baltic Sea region". The focus should be "ecology, traffic and socio-economic issues". In connection with the formulation of the Baltic Sea Strategy in the first half of 2009, the Council of the European Union asked at its meeting in Brussels on 18./19. June 2009 the commission to present an EU strategy for the Danube region by the end of 2010. The Committee of the Regions agreed on 7 October 2009. The committee suggested the expansion of the transport infrastructure, cross-border cooperation in flood protection, joint tourism concepts and regional cultural work as the focal points of the strategy. In particular, the "cultural bridging function of cities and municipalities" was emphasized.

On January 21, 2010, the European Parliament also passed a resolution on a European strategy for the Danube region. It emphasized the role model function of the Baltic Sea strategy and referred to the long tradition of cooperation in the Danube region, which goes back to the European Danube Commission founded in 1856. At the same time, it made it clear that, given the fact that not all countries in the Danube region are members of the EU, the Danube Strategy is an important hub between cohesion policy and the European neighborhood policy. By understanding the Danube region as a macro-region, the regional differences in economic output could be overcome. Specifically, the strategy should include the following elements: environmental protection, improvement of infrastructure, improvement of water quality, safety of shipping traffic, tourism as well as education, research and social cohesion. In addition, academic exchange and cultural dialogue should be promoted.

Based on the resolution of the European Parliament, the Commission published a framework paper on February 2, 2010, in which it called on all stakeholders - Member States, neighboring countries, regions, municipalities, international organizations, social partners and civil society - to participate. In it, she divided the aspects of the Danube Strategy into the following points: improving accessibility and communication systems, protecting the environment and improving water quality, and strengthening socio-economic, human and institutional development. Following the consultation, on December 8, 2010, the Commission presented its proposal for an EU strategy in the Danube region. This was approved on April 13, 2011, by the EU member states, which can now start implementing the strategy.

EU Member States involved 
Bulgaria
Germany
Croatia
Austria
Romania
Slovakia
Slovenia
Czech Republic
Hungary

Other participating states 
Bosnia Herzegovina
Moldova
Montenegro
Serbia
Ukraine

Other actors 
European Commission
European Parliament
Committee of the Regions

Focus 
The EU strategy for the Danube region consists of the four pillars “Connecting the Danube Region”, “Environmental Protection in the Danube Region”, “Building Prosperity in the Danube Region” and “Strengthening the Danube Region”. These four pillars are further subdivided into eleven priority areas. [8] On February 3, 2011, EU Regional Commissioner Johannes Hahn, together with Hungarian Foreign Minister János Martonyi, announced coordinators for the eleven thematic priorities of the EU strategy for the Danube region. The thematic priorities include, among others. promoting the use of sustainable energies, promoting culture and tourism, improving institutional capacity and cooperation.

Infrastructure 
Above all, this includes improving the connection to the Danube region by improving mobility, promoting the use of sustainable energies and promoting culture and tourism. In the area of transport, inland shipping is to be strengthened and road, rail and air transport infrastructures improved. In addition, the energy infrastructure is to be modernized. In the field of culture and tourism, a common and sustainable concept for the upgrading and promotion of the Danube region is to be created.

Environmental Protection 
This concerns, on the one hand, ensuring good water quality in accordance with the EU Water Framework Directive and, on the other hand, disaster prevention and management measures in accordance with the Flood Directive, the Seveso Directive, the Mining Waste Directive and the Environmental Liability Directive. In addition, there is the preservation of biological diversity and nature reserves.

Wealth creation 
This area includes investments in education and job qualifications, research and innovation as well as the targeted promotion of companies through better networking and the establishment of so-called "centers of excellence." It also takes into consideration alleviating poverty and the creation of jobs.

Good governance 
This includes the exchange of experiences on good administrative practice and the fight against corruption, organized and serious crime.

External links 
 Danube Strategy and Baden-Württemberg
 Danube strategy and BW
 Danubestrategy and Bavaria

References 

2010 establishments in Europe
2011 establishments in Europe
History of the European Union
Information technology organizations based in Europe
European Union and science and technology